"To the End" is a 2014 music single performed by singer Yohio in the first semifinal of Melodifestivalen 2014 on 1 February in Malmö Arena.  The song made it to the final to be held at Friends Arena on 8 March from the semifinal, where it finished sixth overall.

Charts

References

Melodifestivalen songs of 2014
Yohio songs
English-language Swedish songs
Songs written by Peter Kvint
Songs written by Andreas Johnson
2014 songs